Vodice may refer to:

Albania
Vodicë, a village in the municipality of Kolonjë
Vodicë, a village in the municipality of Vlorë
Vodicë, a village in the municipality of Poliçan

Croatia
Vodice, Croatia

Czech Republic
Vodice (Tábor District), a municipality and village

Slovenia
Vodice, Ajdovščina, a settlement in the Municipality of Ajdovščina
Vodice, Dobrepolje, a settlement in the Municipality of Dobrepolje
Vodice nad Kamnikom, a settlement in the Municipality of Kamnik
Vodice pri Gabrovki, a settlement in the Municipality of Litija
Vodice pri Kalobju, a settlement in the Municipality of Šentjur
Vodice pri Slivnici, a settlement in the Municipality of Šentjur
Vodice, Vodice, a settlement in the Municipality of Vodice
Vodice, Zagorje ob Savi, a former settlement in the Municipality of Zagorje ob Savi, now part of Jablana